Massala is a town in western Ivory Coast. It is a sub-prefecture and commune of Séguéla Department in Worodougou Region, Woroba District.

In 2014, the population of the sub-prefecture of Massala was 23,021.

Villages
The thirty one villages of the sub-prefecture of Massala and their population in 2014 are:

Notes

Sub-prefectures of Worodougou
Communes of Worodougou